Acacia excentrica is a shrub belonging to the genus Acacia and the subgenus Phyllodineae native to Western Australia.

Description
It has green phyllodes with a narrowly elliptic to oblong-elliptic and sometimes lanceolate shape. It produces yellow flowers from July to October. Seed pods form later that are linear with one or two coils.

Taxonomy
The species was first formally described by the botanists Joseph Maiden and William Blakely in 1928 as part of the work Descriptions of fifty new species and six varieties of western and northern Australian Acacias, and notes on four other species as published in the Journal of the Royal Society of Western Australia. In 2003 it was reclassified as Racosperma excentricum by Leslie Pedley but transferred back into the genus Acacia in 2006.

Distribution
It has a scattered and disjunct distribution to an area in the Goldfields-Esperance, Wheatbelt and Great Southern regions of Western Australia between Albany in the west, Kondinin in the north and Cocklebiddy in the east. It is found on the plains where it grows in loamy or sandy clay soils over limestone.

See also
List of Acacia species

References

excentrica
Acacias of Western Australia
Plants described in 1928
Taxa named by Joseph Maiden
Taxa named by William Blakely